Goah, is a village in the Punjab province of Pakistan.

References

Populated places in Punjab, Pakistan